Stephen Yakubu is a Ghanaian politician and diplomat. He was Ghana’s Ambassador to Morocco and He was a member of Parliament for Binduri constituency in the Upper East Region of Ghana. He is currently the Upper East Regional Minister and also the Chairman of Regional Security Council.

Early life and education
Stephen Yakubu was born on May 25, 1966, at Gotisaliga-Binduri in the Upper East Region. He obtained a BSc in Planning from Kwame Nkrumah University of Science and Technology (KNUST) and a Postgraduate diploma in Information Systems from Thames Valley University Slough, UK.

Career 
Yakubu is into Development Planning, Architecture, and Quantity Surveyors.

Political life 
Yakubu is a member of the New Patriotic Party(NPP). He contested for the Binduri seat on the ticket of the NPP. He was a member of the 5th Parliament of the 4th Republic of Ghana. He obtained 9,103 votes out of the 18,050 valid votes cast which amounts to 50.43% of all valid votes.

Personal life 
He is self-employed and married with two children. He is a Christian and worships with an Adventist church.

References 

Ghanaian MPs 2009–2013
Living people
Kwame Nkrumah University of Science and Technology alumni
New Patriotic Party politicians
Ghanaian architects
1966 births